Taishakugawa Dam is a dam in Shōbara, in the Hiroshima Prefecture of Japan.

Dams in Hiroshima Prefecture
Dams completed in 1924